Darrin Arthur Shannon (born December 8, 1969) is a Canadian former professional ice hockey player who played for the Buffalo Sabres and the Winnipeg Jets/Phoenix Coyotes. He is the younger brother of Darryl Shannon and has 3 daughters with his wife. Darrin was drafted fourth overall in the 1988 NHL Entry Draft, ahead of NHL Stars Jeremy Roenick, Rod Brind'Amour and Teemu Selänne. He recorded 87 goals and 163 assists for 250 points in 506 career NHL games.

He now resides in Alliston, Ontario and is an investment manager.

Awards and Achievements
Canadian Major Junior Scholastic Player of the Year (1988)
Memorial Cup Tournament All-Star Team (1988)

Career statistics

Regular season and playoffs

International

References

External links

1969 births
Living people
Buffalo Sabres players
National Hockey League first-round draft picks
Phoenix Coyotes players
Pittsburgh Penguins draft picks
Rochester Americans players
St. John's Maple Leafs players
Windsor Spitfires players
Winnipeg Jets (1979–1996) players
Ice hockey people from Ontario
Sportspeople from Barrie
Canadian ice hockey left wingers